My Boy Jack can refer to:

My Boy Jack (poem), a poem by Rudyard Kipling
My Boy Jack (play), a play by David Haig, based on the poem
My Boy Jack (film), a 2007 film based on the play